Charles Mingus with Orchestra is an album by American bassist, composer and bandleader Charles Mingus which was recorded in Japan in 1971 and first released on the Japanese Columbia label.

Reception

The Allmusic review by Ken Dryden stated, "This Charles Mingus session is a bit of an oddity, in that he is heard with a Japanese big band, Toshiyuki Miyama & His New Herd Orchestra, which augmented his small group...  the Japanese brass and rhythm sections sound a bit rough in the ensemble passages. Far from an essential date in Charles Mingus' vast discography".

Track listing
All compositions by Charles Mingus
 "The Man Who Never Sleeps" - 16:19 
 "Portrait" - 8:13
 "O.P." - 7:25

Personnel
Charles Mingus - bass
Eddie Preston - trumpet
Bobby Jones - tenor saxophone
Masahiko Sato - piano
Toshiyuki Miyama and His New Herd Orchestra

References

1971 albums
Columbia Records albums
Denon Records albums
Charles Mingus albums